Yenki Kand-e Mirza Almasi (also Romanized as Yenkī Kand-e Mīrzā Almāsī; also known as Bangī Kand-e Almāsī, Yangikand, Yangī Kand Almās, Yangī Kand-e Almās, Yangī Kand-e Mīrzā, Yangī Kand Mīrzā Almās, and Yengī Kand-e Almāsī) is a village in Golabar Rural District, in the Central District of Ijrud County, Zanjan Province, Iran. At the 2006 census, its population was 165, in 47 families.

References 

Populated places in Ijrud County